Linda Meyers (later Tikalsky, born July 1, 1937) is a retired American alpine ski racer, a former member of the United States Ski Team. She competed at the Winter Olympics in 1960 and 1964. On home state snow in 1960, Meyers tumbled in the downhill event, but completed the descent and placed 33rd; she failed to finish the giant slalom. In 1964, she placed 12th in the slalom and 30th in the giant slalom.

At age fourteen, Meyers moved with her family from Los Angeles to Bishop, California, near Mammoth Mountain, and took up skiing following Jill Kinmont Boothe. In addition to the Olympics, she competed at the World Championships in 1958 and 1962, and finished fifth in the combined event in 1962. After retiring from competitions she coached skiers in Colorado.

Olympic results

References

1937 births
Living people
American female alpine skiers
Olympic alpine skiers of the United States
Alpine skiers at the 1960 Winter Olympics
Alpine skiers at the 1964 Winter Olympics
21st-century American women